Estienne is a French surname or given name. Notable people with the name include:

Given name
 Estienne or Étienne de La Boétie (1530–1563), French philosopher, judge and writer
 Estienne Grossin, French composer
 Estienne de La Roche (1470–1530), French mathematician
 Estienne Roger (1665 or 1666–1722), French-born printer and publisher working in the Netherlands
 Estienne du Tertre, French composer

Surname
 Henri Estienne (elder) (died 1521), founder of a French family of scholars and printers
 Robert Estienne (1503–1559), printer and classical scholar, son of the above
 Henri Estienne (1528 or 1531–1598), also known as Henricus Stephanus, printer and classical scholar, son of Robert Estienne
 Charles Estienne (1504–1564), an early exponent of the science of anatomy in France, son of Henri Estienne
 Nicole Estienne (c. 1542–c. 1588), poet, daughter of Charles Estienne
 Jean Baptiste Eugène Estienne (1860–1936), general of artillery and the creator of the French tank arm
 Georges Estienne (1896–1969), aviator, explorer of the Sahara and businessman, son of the general

See also
 École Estienne, the traditional name of the Graduate School of Arts and Printing Industry in Paris
 Étienne (disambiguation)

sv:Estienne